Green Bay Net, was a Web Design and Web Development agency headquartered in Green Bay, Wisconsin, USA.

Business 
Green Bay Net offers Internet services such as web hosting and web development.

History 
Green Bay Net was founded in 1998 by Elliot and Gina Christenson, with the goal to be the best internet and technology provider and solutions consultant in the Green Bay market. Since then the company expanded its service to eastern Wisconsin and expanded its web services nationwide.

On October 2, 2000, Elliot Christenson was quoted in U.S. News & World Report, "When you get right down to it, all they really have to do is flip the switch and we'll be out of business." commenting on the AOL Time Warner merger in 2000.

Green Bay Net Free WiFi initiative on Broadway (Downtown Green Bay) 

In 2007, Green Bay Net which at the time claimed Internet service membership in the thousands, partnered with On Broadway inc to deploy a free wi-fi mesh network down the length of Broadway. This system was operational until the end of 2010.

See also
Web developer
Dark web
Graphic design
Digital Web

References

External links
Official homepage of Green Bay Net

Online companies of the United States
Companies established in 1998
Companies based in Green Bay, Wisconsin
1998 establishments in Wisconsin